Sarah Walter (born 5 May 1978 in Schiltigheim) is a retired French athlete, who specialised in the Javelin. She has held, since 2003, the French javelin record with a throw of 62.53 m.

Biography  
Second in the 1997 Junior European Championships, she won four French national javelin titles  in 1997, 2002, 2003 and 2005.

On 12 June 2002, in Bordeaux, she set a new France Javelin record of 62.48 m, improving by 32 cm the former best national mark held since 2000 by Nadine Auzeil. On 27 June 2003, in Strasbourg, she bettered this record to 62.53 m.

Prize list

National 
 French Championships in Athletics:  
 winner in the javelin 1997,  2002,  2003 and 2005

Records

Notes and references

External links  
 Sarah Walter on the site of the French Athletics Federation

1978 births
Living people
French female javelin throwers
People from Schiltigheim
Sportspeople from Bas-Rhin
20th-century French women
21st-century French women